Lichtenau is a municipality in the district of Paderborn, in North Rhine-Westphalia, Germany.

Geography
Lichtenau is situated on the western slope of the Eggegebirge, approx. 15 km south-east of Paderborn.

Division of the town 
After the local government reforms of 1975 Lichtenau consists of the following 15 districts:
 Lichtenau District
 Asseln
 Atteln
 Blankenrode
 Dalheim
 Ebbinghausen
 Grundsteinheim
 Hakenberg
 Henglarn
 Herbram
 Holtheim
 Husen
 Iggenhausen
 Kleinenberg

Twin Towns 
  Le Mans-Mayet (France—since September 29, 1985
  Rangsdorf (Brandenburg, Germany—since February 27, 1993
  Pieniężno (Poland) -- since Oktober 14th, 1996

References

External links 
 Official site 
 Town history 

Paderborn (district)